Wood Lake may refer to:

Places in the United States
 Wood Lake, Louisiana
 Wood Lake, Minnesota
 Wood Lake, Nebraska

Lakes

Canada
 Wood Lake (British Columbia)

United States
 Wood Lake (Lyon County, Minnesota)
 Wood Lake, a lake in Watonwan County, Minnesota
 Wood Lake (Yellow Medicine County, Minnesota)
 Wood Lake (Montana), a lake in Stillwater County, Montana
 Wood Lake, a lake in Benson County, North Dakota
 Wood Lake Township (disambiguation)

See also
 Woodlake (disambiguation)
 
 Lake Wood
 Lake Woods
 Lake of the Woods